Dollar Law is a hill in the Manor Hills range, part of the Southern Uplands of Scotland. The third highest in the range and the Scottish Borders and fifth highest in southern Scotland, it is frequently climbed with its neighbours Broad Law and Cramalt Craig to the southwest from their direction or as a detour from the hills to the northwest near Drumelzier. Thief's Road, a historic heritage path, passes just south of the summit.

Subsidiary SMC Summits

References

Donald mountains
Southern Uplands
Scottish Borders
Mountains and hills of the Scottish Borders
Mountains and hills of the Southern Uplands